Feniscowles railway station was a railway station that served the village of Feniscowles, in Blackburn with Darwen in Lancashire, England.

History
The station was on the Blackburn to Chorley Line, and was closed in 1960 when passenger services were withdrawn from the route.  Freight services on the line continued until 1966, when the line was closed between Chorley and Feniscowles.  Two years later the line between Feniscowles and Cherry Tree junction was closed.  The station has now been demolished.

References

Services

Disused railway stations in Blackburn with Darwen
Former Lancashire Union Railway stations
Railway stations in Great Britain closed in 1960
Railway stations in Great Britain opened in 1869